Synthemis eustalacta is a species of dragonfly in the family Synthemistidae, 
known as the swamp tigertail. 
It is found in south-eastern Australia, where it inhabits streams and rivers.
It is a slender, medium-sized dragonfly with black and yellow markings.

Gallery

See also
 List of Odonata species of Australia

References

Synthemistidae
Odonata of Australia
Endemic fauna of Australia
Taxa named by Hermann Burmeister
Insects described in 1839